Arshaq-e Gharbi Rural District is in Moradlu District of Meshgin Shahr County, Ardabil province, Iran. At the census of 2006, its population was 7,741 in 1,692 households; there were 6,137 inhabitants in 1,575 households at the following census of 2011; and in the most recent census of 2016, the population of the rural district was 5,157 in 1,513 households. The largest of its 51 villages was Qurt Tappeh, with 594 people.

References 

Meshgin Shahr County

Rural Districts of Ardabil Province

Populated places in Ardabil Province

Populated places in Meshgin Shahr County